Christian Voice may refer to:

 Christian Voice (UK), a UK Christian lobby group
 Christian Voice (United States), an American conservative Christian advocacy group
 Christian Voice, Karachi, a Pakistani newspaper